A Walloon church (French: Église Wallonne; Dutch: Waalse kerk) describes any Calvinist church in the Netherlands and its former colonies whose members originally came from the Southern Netherlands and France and whose native language is French today. Walloon was used during the first centuries. Members of these churches belong to the Walloon Reformed Church (French: Réformé wallon; Dutch: Waals Hervormd or, prior to 1815, Waals Gereformeerd), a denomination of the long-distinguished Dutch-speaking Dutch Reformed Church.

Many refugee Huguenots in their exile, joined to already existing Walloon churches — French language, Calvinism, and flight from persecution in a roughly common geography, being common factors to both Huguenot and Walloon refugee communities.

See also 

 Walloons
 Walloon Church, Amsterdam
 Nieuwe Waalse Kerk
 St Agnes Convent, Arnhem
 Huguenots
 Protestantism in Belgium

External links
 FamilySearch's wiki page, Huguenot Church in the United States

References 

Calvinism in the Netherlands
Reformed denominations in the Netherlands
Dutch Reformed Church
Protestantism in Belgium